Konami Classics Series: Arcade Hits, released as Konami Arcade Collection in Japan and Konami Arcade Classics in Europe and Oceania, is a collection of 15 classic arcade games by Konami for the Nintendo DS.

Lineup 
The compilation features the following games:

When Tutankham and Super Basketball were released in the U.S., they originally kept their original names. "Horror Maze" and "Basketball" are names exclusive to this collection. It is unknown why the games' names were changed. This compilation also marks the first North American appearance of the original TwinBee arcade game in any form.

Other features
 The compilations also includes extensive historical information and options for each game. Additionally, if the system's language is set to Japanese, all the games will run in their Japanese versions, although even then, Tutankham, Hyper Olympic, Super Basketball, TwinBee, and Green Beret still use the Horror Maze, Track and Field, Basketball, RainbowBell, and Rush 'n Attack names respectively in the North America version. Menus and text will also be changed to Japanese. In addition, while the differences between the Japanese and international versions of most of the games are minimal (with Contra displaying its Japanese ateji-based logo in the Japanese setting), Gradius is the most notable exception. When the DS is set to any language other than Japanese, the European version (still called Gradius in this compilation) is seen, which features a different title screen, higher difficulty, lacks the separate "START" screen, and with "Option" renamed "Multiple".
 The "Morning Music" can be heard during the intro. The "Morning Music" is the boot-up music for Konami's Bubble System, which was a hardware Konami used for their arcade games in 1985. Gradius and TwinBee are the two games in this collection that originally ran on the Bubble System.
 While the original arcade version of Track and Field featured Chariots of Fire by Vangelis, in this version, the theme is retained, but has been altered into a non-copyright infringing rendition presumably due to licensing issues. Additionally some music from Rush'n Attack has also been altered.

Reception

Reception for Konami Classics Series: Arcade Hits has been slightly positive, garnering an average score of 76% on Game Rankings. Complaints have revolved around either some of the included games simply (in GameSpot's words) "aren't really worth playing," or the visuals being "squashed" or "jittery." 1UP was even more critical of the included game library, stating "The bulk of the 15-title collection, however, is dated and generally pretty lame." Furthermore, some sites such as IGN or VGRC lamented the lack of Nintendo Wi-Fi Connection support, with VGRC saying "It is a shame, because some of these games would have been made so much greater if we could play them online."

See also
Konami Antiques MSX Collection
Konami Arcade Classics - Also titled Konami 80's Arcade Gallery and Konami 80's AC Special.
Konami Classics for Xbox 360
Konami Collector's Series: Arcade Advanced
List of Konami games

References

2007 video games
Nintendo DS games
Nintendo DS-only games
Konami video game compilations
Video games developed in Japan